The Holy Spirit Cathedral also called Denpasar Cathedral (Katedral Denpasar) is a religious building affiliated with the Catholic Church located in the city of Denpasar on the island of Bali in the south of the Asian country of Indonesia.

The Parish and Cathedral of Denpasar are served by the priests of the Congregation of the Divine Word. The present structure was built between 1993 and 1998. Pastoral work in the Denpasar area mainly focuses on the field of education as the church manages educational centres, but also with groups such as the Charismatic, the Legion of Mary, the Community of The Holy Trinity among others. The Parish Cathedral is divided into 14 ecclesial communities.

The temple follows the Roman or Latin rite and is the mother church of the Diocese of Denpasar (Dioecesis Denpasarensis or Keuskupan Denpasar) which began as an apostolic prefecture in 1950 and was elevated to its present status in 1961 by the bull "Quod Christus" of pope John XXIII.

It is under the pastoral responsibility of Bishop Vincentius Sylvester Tung Kiem San.

Gallery

See also
Roman Catholicism in Indonesia
Holy Spirit

References

Roman Catholic cathedrals in Indonesia
Roman Catholic churches completed in 2017
Churches in Bali
Denpasar
Bali
21st-century Roman Catholic church buildings